Shemitz is an uncommon surname in the United States of America. 

Four descendants of Benjamin Shemitz have Wikipedia pages:
 Nathan Levine (1918–1972), American labor lawyer and witness in Hiss-Chambers case
 Esther Shemitz (1900–1986), American painter and witness in Hiss-Chambers case
 Reuben Shemitz (1894–1970), American attorney and witness in Hiss-Chambers case
 Sylvan Shemitz (1925–2007), American electrical engineer, famed for lighting technologies

(There is a cluster of people named Shemitz in and around Ohio, but they are not related to the New York City / New Haven Shemitz Family.)